Haagse Hout (literally Woods of The Hague) is one of the eight districts of The Hague. This area was originally called Die Haghe Houte, which later became the current Haagse Hout. The district has 45,600 residents as of 2018. It is located in the north-east of the city, bordering Wassenaar to the north and Leidschendam-Voorburg to the east. Haagse Hout is divided into four neighbourhoods:
 Benoordenhout
 Bezuidenhout
 Mariahoeve en Marlot
 Haagse Bos

Bezuidenhout is usually divided further into Bezuidenhout East and Bezuidenhout West. Mariahoeve and Marlot are also sometimes separately named. Villapark Marlot has the highest income of The Hague, and is one of the greener areas. The Haagse Bos is the largest green area, almost completely covered by parks and fields.  This city park divides Haagse Hout into two: Benoordenhout and Bezuidenhout (literally North of the Woods and South of the Woods).

References

Boroughs of The Hague